Zarnusheh (also Romanized as Zarnūsheh; also known as Zanūsheh) is a village in Garakan Rural District, in the Central District of Ashtian County, Markazi Province, Iran. At the 2006 census, its population was 687, in 163 families.

References 

Populated places in Ashtian County